Sir Geoffrey Hill (1932–2016) was an English poet.

Geoffrey or Geoff Hill may also refer to:
 Geoffrey T. R. Hill (1895–1955), British aviator and aeronautical engineer
 Geoffrey Hill (cricketer, born 1934) (1934–2012), English cricketer
 Geoffrey Hill (cricketer, born 1837), English cricketer and British Army officer. 
 Geoff Hill (Northern Ireland journalist) (born 1956), author, journalist and long-distance motorcycle rider
 Geoff Hill (South African journalist) (born 1956), journalist and author working in London, Nairobi and Johannesburg
 Geoff Hill (Australian footballer) (1936–1982), Australian rules footballer
 Geoff Hill (footballer, born 1929) (1929–2006), English footballer
 Geoff Hill (mountaineer) (1941–1967), Australian mountaineer

See also
Geoffrey Hills, mountain range in Antarctica